Island effect may refer to:

 Urban heat island, also known as the Heat island effect, in which metropolitan areas are warmer than the surrounding environment
 Nut Island effect, a management principle when teams become isolated and decrease efficiency
 Foster's rule, also known as the Island rule or the Island effect, where island populations of animals change in size

See also
 Galápagos effect